John Street may refer to:

People

Association football
John Street (footballer, born 1926), English footballer for Liverpool, Sheffield Wednesday and Rotherham United who played as a goalkeeper
Jack Street (footballer, born 1928), English footballer for  Tranmere Rovers, Southport, Bootle Athletic, Reading, Barrow and Netherfield who played as a wing half
Jack Street (footballer, born 1934), English footballer for Bradford City and Lincoln City who played as a winger

Others
 John Street (Australian politician) (1832–1891), Australian member of parliament for East Sydney
 John Street (snooker referee) (1932–2009), British snooker referee
 John Alfred Street, General Officer Commanding, Ceylon
 John Ambrose Street (1795–1865), Canadian lawyer and political figure in New Brunswick
 John F. Street (born 1943), American politician and former mayor of Philadelphia
 Cecil John Charles Street (1884-1964), also known as John Street, British soldier, and novelist

Streets
 John Street (Toronto), Ontario, Canada
 John Street (Markham), Ontario, Canada
 John Street (Hamilton, Ontario)
 John Street, part of Ontario Highway 136, Canada
 John Street (Manhattan), New York, United States

See also
170-176 John Street Building, historic building in New York
116 John Street, historic building in New York
John Street Theatre, New York
John Street Methodist Church, Manhattan
John Street House, historic building in Ohio
John Street Roundhouse, preserved railway roundhouse in Ontario
John Strete (died c. 1414), MP for Dover

Street, John